René Hoppe (born 9 December 1976 in Oelsnitz, Saxony) is a German bobsledder who has competed since 1998. At the 2006 Winter Olympics in Turin, he won a gold medal in the four-man event with teammates Kevin Kuske, André Lange, and Martin Putze.

Hoppe also won eight medals at the FIBT World Championships with five golds (Four-man: 2000, 2003, 2004, 2005, 2008), two silvers (Two-man: 2000, Four-man: 2001), and one bronze (Four-man: 2007).

References
Bobsleigh four-man Olympic medalists for 1924, 1932-56, and since 1964
Bobsleigh two-man world championship medalists since 1931
Bobsleigh four-man world championship medalists since 1930
FIBT profile

1976 births
Living people
German male bobsledders
Bobsledders at the 2006 Winter Olympics
Olympic bobsledders of Germany
Olympic gold medalists for Germany
Olympic medalists in bobsleigh
Medalists at the 2006 Winter Olympics
Sportspeople from Saxony